Hukum Singh Karada (b 1956/57) is an Indian politician belonging to Indian National Congress. He has been representing Shajapur (Vidhan Sabha constituency) as MLA in Madhya Pradesh since 1993, except 2013-18 when he lost to the BJP candidate Arun bhimawad. He was a minister in Madhya Pradesh state government in 2019.

References 

Year of birth missing (living people)
Living people
Indian National Congress politicians from Madhya Pradesh